Thomasville is an unincorporated community in Clayton County, Iowa, United States. Thomasville lies approximately 11 miles away from the county seat of Elkader.

References

Unincorporated communities in Clayton County, Iowa
Unincorporated communities in Iowa